Limnaecia tetramitra is a moth in the family Cosmopterigidae. It is found in Burma.

References

Natural History Museum Lepidoptera generic names catalog

Limnaecia
Moths described in 1931
Moths of Asia
Taxa named by Edward Meyrick